Mewaram Jain (born 7 June 1953) is an Indian politician, currently serving his third term as Member of Rajasthan Legislative Assembly since 2008. He hails from Barmer, Rajasthan. He represents Barmer constituency as Member of Legislative Assembly of Rajasthan. He was appointed as the President Of Cow Service Commission by Government Of Rajasthan.

References

Indian National Congress politicians from Rajasthan
Members of the Rajasthan Legislative Assembly
1953 births
Living people